Stagecoach Theatre Arts Ltd is a professional part-time theatre arts school, with over 600 schools in the United Kingdom. Training is offered in singing, dancing and acting.

Stagecoach Theatre Arts is a franchise for part-time theatre arts schools in Australia, Canada, Germany, Gibraltar, Malta, Spain and the UK.

Notable alumni
 Sebastian Croft, actor 
 Jamie Bell, actor
 Esmé Bianco, model, actress – starred in Game of Thrones and burlesque/cabaret performer
 Zoe Birkett, Pop Idol series one (2001–2002) finalist, singer and actress
 Jonny Clarke, actor who portrayed Bart McQueen in Hollyoaks
 Lorna Fitzgerald, actress who portrayed Abi Branning in EastEnders
 Tom Fletcher, lead singer and songwriter in Mcfly
 Elliot Francis, actor
 Dani Harmer, actress who starred in Tracy Beaker
 Myleene Klass, actress, singer, model, pianist, radio and television presenter
 Cher Lloyd, The X Factor (2010) finalist
 Clare Maguire, singer 
 Stuart Piper, agent
 Bella Ramsey, actress
 Aaron Renfree, S Club 8 singer, actor, dancer on The Voice UK
 Shannon Saunders, singer, winner of Disney Channel UK contest My Camp Rock 2
 Diana Vickers, singer, actress The X Factor (2008) finalist
 Emma Watson, actress 	
 Ellie Darcey-Alden, actress
 Carla Woodcock, actress who has appeared in Free Rein and Ackley Bridge
 Megan Millson, model-vogue (former series regular in Eastenders)
 Samuel Goldberg, dancer- royal ballet (former series regular in Eastenders)

References

External links
 Stagecoach Performing Arts

Drama schools in the United Kingdom